Caroline Sara Dubois (born 11 January 2001) is a British professional boxer. She has been Youth Olympic champion, World Youth champion and four-times European Youth champion. She is the younger sister of heavyweight world champion of boxing, Daniel Dubois.

Early life
Dubois is one of eleven children. She was raised in a single-parent family by her father, a native of Grenada.

Amateur career
Dubois started boxing at the age of nine. While there were all-girl amateur boxing clubs in her city, her father wanted her to practice at a top-flight club where her older brother Daniel had trained. For her first few months at Repton Amateur Boxing Club, Dubois pretended to be a boy named Colin.

At the 2017 European Junior Championships, Dubois beat Nune Asatrian by unanimous points decision in the final to take the title. The following year, she had a win at the English National Youth Championships (60 kg), with a unanimous points decision against Ellis Hopkins.

She became England's first World Youth Champion by recording a win over Asatrian by unanimous points decision in August 2018, having previously won in her semi-final by unanimous decision against Rebeca Santos. At the Girls' lightweight competition at the 2018 Summer Youth Olympics Dubois won the gold medal by beating Porntip Buapa in the final.

The 2019 European Youth Championships in 2019 saw Dubois achieve a unanimous points win over Amina Abramova in their semi-final, before winning the title with a split decision against Asatrian in the final. Her next fight was the final of the England Boxing National Youth Championships, which she won by unanimous decision against Wenessa Orczwk. As of February 2020, Dubois was unbeaten, and expressed an ambition to turn professional.

Dubois won the SportsAid One-to-Watch award for 2018, having been chosen from around 1,000 candidates across 60 sports nominated by their sport's governing bodies. She had previously been on the shortlist of ten for the 2017 award. and was named BBC Young Sports Personality of the Year in 2019.

She qualified for the 2020 Summer Olympics at the 2020 European Boxing Olympic Qualification Tournament, where she took the silver medal after losing to Kellie Harrington on a split decision in the final. At the time of turning pro, Dubois had an amateur record of 37 wins and 3 losses.

Professional career
In February 2022, Dubois won her first professional bout against Vaida Masiokaite by a points decision.
In March 2022, Dubois had a first-round stoppage victory (49 seconds) over Martina Horgasz at Wembley Arena.
In December 2022 she beat her opponent, Rodriguez, by TKO at the 1st minute of the 1st round.

Achievements
2016 European junior champion (54 kg)
2017 European junior champion (60 kg)
2018 English National Youth Champion (60kg)
2018 European junior champion (60 kg)
2018 Youth Olympic Games champions (Girls' lightweight)
2018 World Women's Youth Champion (60 kg)
2019 English National Youth Champion (60kg)
2019 European Women's Youth Champion (60 kg)

Professional boxing record

References

External links
 

2001 births
Living people
English women boxers
Boxers at the 2018 Summer Youth Olympics
Lightweight boxers
Youth Olympic gold medalists for Great Britain
English sportspeople of Grenadian descent
Black British sportswomen
Boxers from Greater London
People from Enfield, London
Boxers at the 2020 Summer Olympics
Olympic boxers of Great Britain